Walewale is one of the constituencies represented in the Parliament of Ghana. It elects one Member of Parliament (MP) by the [first past the post] / Simple Majority] system of election. Walewale is located in the West Mamprusi Municipal of the North East Region of Ghana. It is the Municipal capital of West Mamprusi Municipal Assembly. The constituency was formerly called the West Mamprusi Constituency.

Boundaries
The seat is located entirely within the Nanumba South district of the Northern Region of Ghana.

Members of Parliament

Elections

See also
List of Ghana Parliament constituencies

References 

Parliamentary constituencies in the North East Region (Ghana)